Zirándaro    is one of the 81 municipalities of Guerrero, in south-western Mexico. The municipal seat lies at Zirándaro de los Chávez. The municipality covers an area of 2,475.6 km².

As of 2005, the municipality had a total population of 20,053.

References

Municipalities of Guerrero